"Stars at Tallapoosa" is a poem from Wallace Stevens's first book of poetry, Harmonium. It was first published  in 1922, so it is in the public domain. 

It can be read as one of Stevens's poems about the transfiguring power of poetic imagination, which in this case need not accept the night of the dolorous criers, but instead find in it qualities, like a sheaf of brilliant arrows or the nimblest motions, that make it the delight of the secretive hunter.

Buttel finds this poem noteworthy for its connections to Whitman. Like Whitman, Stevens prized the lyrical qualities of American place names and animal names, and the title of this poem is one of Buttel's examples. He reads "Stars at Tallapoosa" as partly a refutation of Whitman's "Out of the Cradle Endlessly Rocking" yet at the same time a variation on the mood and theme of that poem, even displaying some of Whitman's tone and manner, as in the lines about wading the sea-lines and mounting the earth-lines. Less brooding than Whitman's poem, "Stars at Tallapoosa" calls for an "active, imaginative transcendence over the blackness: in the mind's eye of his secretive hunter the intangible lines between the stars should become 'brilliant arrows' which will redeem his isolation."

Eleanor Cook recommends comparing the argument of this poem with Stevens's "Palace of the Babies".

Notes

References 

 Buttel, Robert. Wallace Stevens: The Making of Harmonium. 1967:  Princeton University Press.
 Cook, Eleanor. A Reader's Guide to Wallace Stevens. 2007: Princeton University Press.

1922 poems
American poems
Poetry by Wallace Stevens